Adrián Andrés Mahía Gargantini (born December 2, 1967) is a former Argentine soccer striker, who played professional football in Argentina, Mexico, El Salvador and Costa Rica.

Career
Many of the most important moments of his career came with Deportivo Saprissa of Costa Rica, during the 1990s. With Saprissa, he two national championships, as well as one CONCACAF Champions Cups. He also played with Club Deportivo Águila of El Salvador, Cruz Azul and Toros Neza and Zacatepec of Mexico.

In his native Argentina he played for Belgrano de Córdoba, Club Atlético Platense, Independiente, Rosario Central and Club Atlético Juventud Unida Universitario.

Mahía was an excellent goal scorer, with great skills for shooting headers and a lot of physical strength. He is always remembered by Saprissa's fans because he played with too much heart, always giving the most of himself while leaving everything in the fields.

He was the best goal scorer in the 1999 Costa Rica's first division tournament, in which he managed to score 21 goals. Retired from soccer, he now lives in his home country.

Titles

External links

 Adrián Mahía – Argentine Primera statistics at Fútbol XXI 
 

1967 births
Living people
Sportspeople from Mendoza Province
Argentine footballers
Association football forwards
Club Atlético Belgrano footballers
Club Atlético Platense footballers
C.D. Águila footballers
Cruz Azul footballers
Club Atlético Independiente footballers
Rosario Central footballers
Deportivo Saprissa players
Club Atlético Zacatepec players
Argentine Primera División players
Argentine expatriate footballers
Expatriate footballers in Mexico
Expatriate footballers in Costa Rica
Expatriate footballers in El Salvador
Toros Neza footballers